André Jean Baptiste Robineau-Desvoidy (1 January 1799 in Saint-Sauveur-en-Puisaye – 25 June 1857 in Paris) was a French physician and entomologist specialising in the study of Diptera (flies) and to some extent of the Coleoptera (beetles).

Achievements

Because he worked on difficult to identify flies (specifically the Schizophora), the existing descriptions of which were poor, and because he had few contacts, many of the new species he described were already named.  Also he was over reliant on colour and pattern as characters, and this led to his improperly defining species.  He also worked on too many species.  Much later criticism ensued but it must be remembered that he was an early worker and, in the aftermath of the Napoleonic Wars, French scientists were unduly criticised for nationalistic reasons.  Very many of his generic and species names survive.  In all these respects, as well as his genuine love of entomology and boundless enthusiasm, Robineau-Desvoidy is reminiscent of the English entomologist Francis Walker.

Flies named by Robineau-Desvoidy
Brachyopa scutellaris 1843 - Syrphidae
Calliphora vicina 1830 - Calliphoridae
Thecopohora fulvipes 1830 - Conopidae
Genus Morellia and species Morellia aenescens 1830- Muscidae
Genus Azelia and species Azelia nebulosa Robineau-Desvoidy, 1830
Genus Hydromyia 1830 Sciomyzidae
Genus Herina 1830- Ulidiidae
Genus Sphenella 1830- Tephritidae
Genus Delia 1830-Anthomyidae
Genus Bengalia 1830- Calliphoridae
Genus Rutilia 1830- Tachinidae
Genus Muscina and species fungivora 1830- Muscidae

Works
(Selected)
Essai sur la tribu des culicides. Mém. Soc. Hist. Nat. Paris 3: 390-413 (1827).
Essai sur les myodaires. Mém. Pres. Div. Sav. Acad. R. Sci. Inst. Fr. 2(2), 813 p. (1830).
Notice sur le genre fucellie, Fucellia, R.D., et en particulier sur le Fucellia arenaria. Ann. Soc. Entomol. Fr. 10: 269-72. (1842).
Myodaires des environs de Paris [part]. Ann. Soc. Entomol. Fr. (2) 6: 429-77. (1849).This paper forms part of a series, though the first part had the title "Études sur les myodaires des environs de Paris." The parts are as follows: Ann. Soc. Entomol. Fr. (2) 2: 5-38 (1844); (2) 4: 17-38 (1846); (2) 5: 255-87 (1847); (2) 6: 429-77 (1849); (2) 8: 183-209 (1850); (2) 9: 177-90, 305-21 (1851).
Mémoire of M. Léon Dufour donne la description de la larve et des moeurs d'une muscide, larve qui vit du sang de petites hirondelles. Bull. Soc. Entomol. Fr. (2) 7: iv-v. (1849)
Description d'agromyzes et de phytomyzes écloses chez M. le colonel Goureau. Rev. Mag. Zool. (2) 3: 391-405. (1851)
Diptères des environs de Paris. Famille des myopaires. Bull. Soc. Sci. Hist. Nat. L'Yonne 7: 83-160. (1853).
Histoire naturelle des diptères des environs de Paris. Oeuvre posthume du Dr Robineau-Desvoidy. Publiée par les soins de sa famille, sous la direction de M.H. Monceaux.2 vols. Masson et Fils, Paris. 1500p. (1863)

Collection
The collection of Robineau-Desvoidy was largely destroyed. Some remains in the Muséum National d'Histoire Naturelle, Paris and there are some specimens from it in the Hope Department of Entomology of the University Museum, Oxford

References
Jean Gouillard (2004). Histoire des entomologistes français, 1750-1950. Édition entièrement revue et augmentée. Boubée (Paris) : 287 p
Jacques d’Aguilar, 2007 Le Docteur Robineau-Desvoidy ou l’erreur est humaine INRA

External links
Followers of Lamarck French website with a list of publications and photographs of Robineau-Desvoidy's signature.

French entomologists
Dipterists
 01
1799 births
1857 deaths
French taxonomists
19th-century French zoologists